Hebe: A Estrela do Brasil (English: Hebe: The Star of Brazil) is a 2019 Brazilian biographical film directed by Maurício Farias. It stars Andréa Beltrão in the role of the TV host Hebe Camargo.

It was selected to compete for the Kikito award at the 47th Gramado Film Festival.

Cast 
 Andréa Beltrão as Hebe Camargo
 Marco Ricca as Lélio Ravagnani
 Danton Mello as Cláudio Pessutti
 Gabriel Braga Nunes as Décio Capuano
 Caio Horowicz as Marcello Camargo
 Danilo Grangheia as Walter Clark
 Otávio Augusto as Chacrinha
 Cláudia Missura as Nair Bello
 Karine Teles as Lolita Rodrigues
 Daniel Boaventura as Silvio Santos
 Ivo Müller as Carlucho
 Stella Miranda as Dercy Gonçalves
 Renata Bastos as Roberta Close

Accolades

References

External links 
 

2019 films
2019 biographical drama films
2010s Portuguese-language films
Biographical films about entertainers
Brazilian biographical drama films
Films about television people
Films set in the 1980s
Films set in São Paulo